The Minister for Public Finance, Planning and Community Wealth is a Junior ministerial post in the Scottish Government. As a result, the Minister does not attend the Scottish Cabinet. The post was created in June 2018: the Minister supports the Cabinet Secretary for Finance, who is a full member of cabinet.

Overview
The Minister for Public Finance, Planning and Community Wealth has specific responsibility for: 
Managing the public finances
Scottish budget, budgetary monitoring and reporting
Fiscal policy and taxation
Digital economy & digital public services 
Public sector pensions

List of office holders 
The current Minister for Public Finance and Migration is Tom Arthur.

See also
Scottish Parliament

References

External links 
 Minister for Public Finance and Migration on Scottish Government website

Public Finance and Digital Economy
Economy of Scotland
Finance ministers of Scotland
Economy ministers
Public finance of Scotland